Kardam is a village in Popovo Municipality, in Targovishte Province, Bulgaria.

References

Villages in Targovishte Province